The Story of may refer to:
 The Story of Demis Roussos, a 1987 album by Demis Roussos
 The Story of (book series), a collection of picture books written by Ying Chang Compestine and illustrated by Yongsheng Xuan
 The Story of..., a series of documentary style programmes by Channel 5